John Charlton Kinchant (1846 – November 26, 1923) was a Canadian politician. He served in the Legislative Assembly of British Columbia from 1899 to 1900 from the electoral district of Cariboo.

Election results

|-

|- bgcolor="white"
!align="right" colspan=3|Total valid votes
!align="right"|689
!align="right"|100.00%
!align="right"|
|- bgcolor="white"
!align="right" colspan=3|Total rejected ballots
!align="right"|
!align="right"|
!align="right"|
|- bgcolor="white"
!align="right" colspan=3|Turnout
!align="right"|%
!align="right"|
!align="right"|
|}

|-

|- bgcolor="white"
!align="right" colspan=3|Total valid votes
!align="right"|758
!align="right"|100.00%
!align="right"|
|- bgcolor="white"
!align="right" colspan=3|Total rejected ballots
!align="right"|
!align="right"|
!align="right"|
|- bgcolor="white"
!align="right" colspan=3|Turnout
!align="right"|%
!align="right"|
!align="right"|
|}

References

1846 births
1923 deaths
Members of the Legislative Assembly of British Columbia